DeWanda Wise (née Jackson) (born May 30, 1984) is an American actress. She starred in Spike Lee's Netflix comedy-drama series She's Gotta Have It (2017–19), a contemporary adaptation of his 1986 film.

Early life and education 
Wise was born in Jessup, Maryland and raised in Woodlawn, Laurel, and Baltimore. In high school, she thought she wanted to be a therapist until she took AP Psychology and decided it was not for her. She began acting during her sophomore year at Atholton High School when her high school theatre director, Nathan Rosen, offered her a part in a production in lieu of detention. In 2006, she graduated from New York University's Tisch School of the Arts with a bachelor's in fine arts in drama and urban studies, where she befriended Gina Rodriguez. During her undergraduate years, Wise worked as a resident assistant and a stocker at Trader Joe's.

Career
Wise first appeared in episodes of television series including Law & Order: Special Victims Unit, The Good Wife and Boardwalk Empire. She made her film debut in the 2007 drama Spinning into Butter starring Sarah Jessica Parker, then had secondary roles in Steam (2007) and Precious (2009). In 2016, she starred in the independent romantic comedy film How to Tell You're a Douchebag that premiered at Sundance Film Festival. The next year, she had a recurring role in the WGN period drama series Underground, and starred opposite Sanaa Lathan in the Fox miniseries Shots Fired.

In 2017, she had a leading role in the Netflix comedy-drama series She's Gotta Have It, which was canceled after two seasons in 2019. In 2018, she was cast in Disney's Captain Marvel, but left the project due scheduling conflicts with her Netflix series. That year, she appeared in the comedy film The Weekend directed by Stella Meghie. In 2019, she starred with Gina Rodriguez and Brittany Snow in the romantic comedy film Someone Great for Netflix, where she and a pantsless Rodriguez sung and danced to Lizzo's "Truth Hurts", ultimately making the song more popular and a #1 hit on the Billboard Hot 100. She later appeared opposite Kevin Hart and Alfre Woodard in the comedy-drama Fatherhood (2021), and co-starred in the sequel Jurassic World Dominion.

Personal life 
Wise married actor Alano Miller in 2009 after three months of dating. She is a vegan. She lives in Pasadena, California.

Filmography

Film

Television

References

External links 
 

Living people
American television actresses
21st-century American actresses
African-American actresses
Atholton High School alumni
Tisch School of the Arts alumni
Actresses from Baltimore
Actresses from Pasadena, California
People from Laurel, Maryland
1984 births